Molly E. Holzschlag (born January 25, 1963) is a U.S. author, lecturer and advocate of the Open Web. She has written or co-authored 35 books on web design and open standards, including The Zen of CSS Design: Visual Enlightenment for the Web (co-authored with Dave Shea). She was named the Fairy Godmother of the Web.

Campaigning for web standards

Holzschlag conceived and led the first five years of Open Web Camp, a free event in the silicon valley from 2009-2013. Her work focused on Open Web technologies, web design and accessibility. She was the 2004–2006 group lead for the Web Standards Project (WaSP), a coalition that campaigned browser makers such as Microsoft, Opera and Netscape to support modern web standards.

She has participated as a World Wide Web Consortium (W3C) Invited Expert on the CSS Working Group, chaired the CSS Accessibility Community Group, and was an Invited Expert on the HTML and GEO Working Groups.

Teaching work

In 2011, Holzschlag worked for Knowbility, teaching classes on Open Web technologies such as HTML5 and ARIA, with a strong emphasis on using inclusive design to overcome accessibility barriers. She has also taught webmaster courses for the University of Arizona, University of Georgia, University of Phoenix, New School University, Pima Community College.

Writing
Holzschlag has written or co-authored 35 books on web design and open standards, including The Zen of CSS Design: Visual Enlightenment for the Web (co-authored with Dave Shea).

Personal life

Holzschlag was diagnoed with aplastic anemia in 2014. She has spoken about the problems with health care finance in the United States.

Notable awards 

 2016, O'Reiilly Web Platform Award
 2015, Net Award for Outstanding contribution
 1998, named one of the Webgrrls San Francisco chapter's Top 25 Women on the Web,

Bibliography

References

External links

Web With Molly

1963 births
Living people
American technology writers
Web developers
American computer programmers
American women computer scientists
American computer scientists
Women technology writers
21st-century American women